Massimo Grima, also known as missier il-Hamrunizi, (born 6 August 1979 in Malta) is a professional retired footballer, where he played as a defensive midfielder. Massimo was often used as a defensive midfielder, sitting just in front of the centre backs, but in fact he could also play as a centre back himself.

Playing career

Mosta
In January 2008, Grima joined Maltese First Division side Mosta on loan from Valletta for the remainder of the 2007–08 season, Grima helped the club to a 2nd-place finish in the Maltese First Division, the club however missed the chance to get promoted after losing the promotion playoff final to Qormi. During the spell, Grima made 11 appearances and scored three goals.

Qormi
With first team opportunities at a low with Valletta, Grima was again loaned out, this time he was loaned out to newly promoted Maltese Premier League side Qormi for the 2008–09 season. Massimo helped the club avoid the threat of relegation by finishing in seventh position in the Maltese Premier League, making 23 appearances, and scoring two goals during the season.

Grima's loan with Qormi was renewed for the 2009–10 season, in which Grima would spend another season with the club. Qormi impressed during the course of the season and even led the Maltese Premier League at times, Grima's performances were so impressive he gained a recall to the Maltese national team.

Post Retirement
After retirement, Massimo still likes to keep himself involved in football. He regularly plays 5 a side matches with his closest friends, one of which is Noel Agius, who has a diamond of a right foot and will knock you out if you get on his bad side.

External links
 Massimo Grima at MaltaFootball.com
 

1979 births
Living people
Maltese footballers
Maltese Premier League players
Pietà Hotspurs F.C. players
Sliema Wanderers F.C. players
Valletta F.C. players
Mosta F.C. players
Qormi F.C. players
Ħamrun Spartans F.C. players
Association football midfielders
Malta youth international footballers
Malta under-21 international footballers
Malta international footballers